Nathan Victor Johnson (1887 – 5 November 1963) was an English professional footballer who played as a forward.

References

1887 births
1963 deaths
Footballers from Gateshead
English footballers
Association football forwards
Windy Nook F.C. players
Grimsby Town F.C. players
Castleford Town F.C. players
Charlton's F.C. players
Cleethorpes Town F.C. players
Haycroft Rovers F.C. players
English Football League players